The Honda LaGreat, known in some markets as the Honda RL1, is a passenger van produced by Japanese automaker Honda for the Japanese market. Produced in Alliston, Ontario, Canada, the LaGreat was a rebadged version of the second generation North American Odyssey. The LaGreat was announced in 1999 as a larger and more luxurious model than the existing Japanese Honda Odyssey. Production of the model continued until 2005, when it was succeeded by the Elysion.

Background

With the success of the existing Odyssey minivan, Honda elected to design a luxury medium-sized passenger carrier for the consumer market. Honda marketed the LaGreat as an all-family vehicle, with abundant practicality and reliability.

The LaGreat was offered with a more powerful six-cylinder engine, which initially produced 210 horsepower and was later upgraded to produce 240. Additionally, Honda offered the option of seating eight adults, through a bench seat in both the middle and third rows. At the time, the LaGreat was one of the largest minivans available in Japan, rivaling the size of the Toyota Estima and Chrysler Grand Voyager. Leather seats were standard and a moonroof was optional on the top-end Exclusive variant.

Technology
The Honda LaGreat was the first passenger van available with a navigation system and a rear DVD entertainment unit. Additionally, from 2002 to 2005, the LaGreat had optional fog lights and side curtain airbags.

Criticism
The LaGreat failed to meet Honda's expected sales figures, primarily due to the van's price. Additionally, the van failed to appeal to the Japanese market base due to its larger size and the fact that its fuel economy was worse than the competition. The LaGreat was regarded as a luxury vehicle in Japan due to Japanese Government dimension regulations and road tax obligations Japanese owners had to pay every year. Honda sold luxury vehicles in Japan at Honda Clio dealerships.

References

LaGreat
Minivans
Cars introduced in 1998
2000s cars